Francisco Alejandro Bautista Portillo (born 25 January 1981) is a Panamanian footballer, who currently plays for Atlético Nacional.

Club career
He started his career at Sporting 89 and played for various local sides before embarking on a career abroad, playing several years in Salvadoran football. He joined Once Municipal in February 2007 and in January 2008 moved to ambitious capital club San Salvador, only to leave them for Alianza in July 2008.

He returned to Panama in January 2010 to play for his first ever club Sporting San Miguelito again and later joined Second Division side Atlético Nacional. In November 2013, he saved two SUNTRACS penalties to earn his side a place in the 2nd division championship final, but they eventually missed out on promotion to Atlético Chiriquí.

International career
Portillo made his debut for Panama in an August 2001 friendly match against Brazil in which he came on as a last-minute substitute for Óscar McFarlane and has earned a total of 4 caps, scoring no goals.

His final international was a March 2004 friendly match against Cuba.

In 2015, Portillo was named in the Panama national beach soccer team.

References

External links

Player profile - El Gráfico 

1981 births
Living people
Association football goalkeepers
Panamanian footballers
Panama international footballers
San Francisco F.C. players
Tauro F.C. players
C.D. Árabe Unido players
Once Municipal footballers
San Salvador F.C. footballers
Alianza F.C. footballers
Sporting San Miguelito players
Panamanian expatriate footballers
Expatriate footballers in El Salvador